Linda may refer to:

As a name
 Linda (given name), a female given name (including a list of people and fictional characters so named)
 Linda (singer) (born 1977), stage name of Svetlana Geiman, a Russian singer
 Anita Linda (born Alice Lake in 1924), Filipino film actress
 Bogusław Linda (born 1952), Polish actor
 Solomon Linda (1909–1962), South African Zulu musician, singer and composer who wrote the song "Mbube" which later became "The Lion Sleeps Tonight"

Places
 Linda, California, a census-designated place
 Linda, Missouri, a ghost town
 Linda, Tasmania, Australia, a ghost town
 Linda, Georgia, village in Abkhazia, Georgia
 Linda, Bashkortostan, village in Bashkortostan, Russia
 Linda Valley, Tasmania
 7169 Linda, an asteroid
 Linda, a small lunar crater - see Delisle (crater)

Music
 Linda (Linda George album), 1974
 Linda (Linda Clifford album), 1977
 Linda (Miguel Bosé album), 1978
 "Linda" (Miguel Bosé song), the title song 
 "Linda" (1946 song), a popular song written by Jack Lawrence
 "Linda", a song by Ann Ronnell, written for the 1945 film The Story of G.I. Joe
 "Linda (Tokischa and Rosalía song)", 2021

Fiction
 Linda (1929 film), an American film
 Linda (1960 film), a British teen drama
 Linda (1973 film), a TV movie directed by Jack Smight
 Linda (1993 film), starring Richard Thomas and Virginia Madsen
 Linda (Sesame Street), a character appearing in Sesame Street
 Linda (TV series), a Hungarian action adventure series
 "Linda", a poem by Patti Smith from her 1972 book Seventh Heaven

Other uses
 Tropical Storm Linda, various hurricanes, cyclones and storms
 Linda (magazine), a Dutch magazine
 Linda (Estonian magazine) (1887–1905), a feminist literary magazine in Estonia
 Linda (beetle), a genus of beetles in the family Cerambycidae
 Linda (coordination language), a programming language
 La Linda International Bridge, across the Rio Grande between the U.S. and Mexico

See also
 "Linda Linda", a 1987 single by the Japanese rock band The Blue Hearts, central to the below film
 Linda Linda Linda, a 2005 Japanese film
 Lynda, a given name
 Pretty (disambiguation)